Meall Chuaich (951 m) is a mountain in the Grampian Mountains of Scotland, located east of the village of Dalwhinnie.

Although the mountain lacks any distinctive features, it still offers good views from its summit towards Badenoch and Strathspey in the north. One of the easier Munros to climb, walks usually begin at the
A9, where there is a lay-by at the start.

References

Mountains and hills of Highland (council area)
Marilyns of Scotland
Munros